The anterior lobe of cerebellum is the portion of the cerebellum responsible for mediating unconscious proprioception. Inputs into the anterior lobe of the cerebellum are mainly from the spinal cord. It is sometimes equated to the "paleocerebellum".

Clinical significance

Anterior lobe syndrome 
When a person gets most of their calories from alcohol (chronic alcoholism) the anterior lobe can deteriorate due to malnutrition. This is known as anterior lobe syndrome, and it causes unsteady gait.

Additional images

References

External links

 
 NIF Search - Anterior Lobe of the Cerebellum via the Neuroscience Information Framework

Cerebellum